Taras Bulba (French: Tarass Boulba) is a 1936 French historical drama film directed by Alexis Granowsky and starring Harry Baur, Jean-Pierre Aumont and Danielle Darrieux. It is one of many films based on the story of Taras Bulba.

The film's sets were designed by the art directors Lucien Aguettand and Andrej Andrejew. The costumes were designed by Georges Annenkov. Many of the film's production team were Russian exiles, who had left following the Russian Revolution. The rights to the film were bought by Alexander Korda who remade it in Britain as The Rebel Son.

Cast

References

External links

French historical drama films
1930s historical drama films
Films based on Taras Bulba
Films directed by Alexis Granowsky
Films set in Ukraine
Films set in the 16th century
French black-and-white films
Films scored by Paul Dessau
1936 drama films
1930s French-language films
1930s French films